Lieutenant-General Henry Cornewall (1685 – 4 June 1756) was a British Army officer.

He was the eldest son of Colonel Henry Cornewall of Moccas Court, Herefordshire; Velters Cornewall and James Cornewall were his half-brothers.

After service with the 2nd Troop of Horse Guards, Cornewall was colonel of the 7th Regiment of Marines from 1740 to 1748, Member of Parliament for Hereford from 1747 to 1754, and Governor of Londonderry from 1749 until his death.

He was made Groom of the Bedchamber to King George I in 1714, serving in the royal household until the King's death in 1727.

He died unmarried.

References

1685 births
1756 deaths
British Army lieutenant generals
Members of the Parliament of Great Britain for English constituencies
British MPs 1747–1754
British Life Guards officers